José Fernando Bautista Quintero is a Colombian lawyer and politician. Bautista was appointed Ambassador of Colombia to Venezuela by President Juan Manuel Santos Calderón to mend relations with the administration of President Hugo Chávez Frías after the 2010 Colombia–Venezuela diplomatic crisis that had driven the two neighbouring nations to the brink of armed conflict. He has also served as the President of the Agrarian Bank of Colombia, Minister of Communications, Mayor of Cúcuta, and Colombian Consul in Pretoria, and São Paulo.

Minister of Communications
In 1996 while serving as General Secretary of the Colombian Liberal Party, President Ernesto Samper Pizano appointed Bautista as Deputy Minister of Communications, officially being sworn in on 27 August 1996. The next year on 26 August 1997, Bautista was appointed Minister of Communications replacing his former boss Saulo Arboleda Gómez.

Personal life
He was born in Cúcuta to Jorge Bautista Hernández and Blanca Quintero Mora.

References

1964 births
Living people
People from Bogotá
Free University of Colombia alumni
20th-century Colombian lawyers
Social Party of National Unity politicians
Colombian Liberal Party politicians
Ministers of Communications of Colombia
Mayors of places in Colombia
People from Cúcuta
Ambassadors of Colombia to Venezuela